Sábato Antonio Magaldi (May 9, 1927 – July 14, 2016) was a Brazilian theater critic, playwright, journalist, teacher, essayist and historian.

Biography 
Magaldi was born in Belo Horizonte. He graduated in the law course; however, before the age of 20, he wrote his first criticism, of a play by Jean-Paul Sartre, beginning his career as a theater critic. In 1948, he moved to Rio de Janeiro, where he wrote reviews for the newspaper Diário Carioca, replacing Paulo Mendes Campos as a critic. In 1953, Magaldi went to work in São Paulo, exercising his role in the newspapers O Estado de São Paulo and in Jornal da Tarde, starting in 1966.

He was professor of History of the Brazilian Theater at the School of Dramatic Art at the School of Communications and Arts of the University of São Paulo. He also taught for four years at French universities at the University of Paris III (Sorbonne Nouvelle) and University of Provence. He also was the first municipal secretary of Culture of São Paulo, between April 1975 and July 1979, in the Olavo Setúbal administration.

Magaldi was a member of the Brazilian Academy of Letters, being elected on December 8, 1994, taking office in July 1995, occupying the chair No. 24 after Ciro dos Anjos.

Work
Sábato Magaldi was one of the organizers of the work of Nelson Rodrigues, of whom he was a personal friend, and was responsible for the classification of his plays according to theme and genre (Tragedies of Rio, Mythical Pieces and Psychological Pieces).

Personal life and death 
Magaldi was married to writer Edla Van Steen.

On July 2, he was admitted to the Samaritano Hospital in São Paulo, with septic shock and pulmonary impairment, and died on July 14, 2016.

Books written 

Panorama do Teatro Brasileiro - Global Editora, 2001
Iniciação ao Teatro - Editora Ática, 1998
O Cenário do Avesso - Editora Perspectiva, 1991
Um Palco Brasileiro - O Arena de São Paulo - Editora Brasiliense
Nelson Rodrigues - Dramaturgia e Encenações - Editora PerspectivaO Texto no Teatro - Editora PerspectivaAs Luzes da Ilusão, em parceria com Lêdo Ivo - Global EditoraModerna Dramaturgia Brasileira - Editora Perspectiva, 1998Depois do Espetáculo - Editora Perspectiva, 2003Teatro da Obsessão - Nelson Rodrigues. Editora Global, 2004Teatro da Ruptura - Oswald de Andrade. Editora Global, 2003Teatro de Sempre - Editora Perspectiva, 2006Cem Anos de Teatro em São Paulo - Editora Senac, 2001. Em colaboração com Maria Thereza Vargas
Edição da obras de Nelson Rodrigues. Teatro Completo - Editora Global, vários volumes
Teatro Vivo - responsável pela coleção

See also 

 Renata Pallottini

References

External links 

 Perfil no sítio oficial da Academia Brasileira de Letras (em português)
 Enciclopédia Itaú Cultural
 Ministério das Relações Exteriores
 Oitenta anos de Sábato Magaldi, texto de Deolinda Vilhena

1927 births
2016 deaths
Brazilian essayists
Brazilian people of Italian descent
Brazilian theatre critics
Members of the Brazilian Academy of Letters
Academic staff of the University of São Paulo